Communauté d'agglomération du Bassin de Brive is an intercommunal structure, centred on the city of Brive-la-Gaillarde. It is located in the Corrèze department, in the Nouvelle-Aquitaine region, south-central France. It was created in January 2014. Its seat is in Brive-la-Gaillarde. Its area is 808.7 km2. Its population was 107,749 in 2017, of which 46,916 in Brive-la-Gaillarde proper.

Composition
The communauté d'agglomération consists of the following 48 communes:

Allassac
Ayen
Brignac-la-Plaine
Brive-la-Gaillarde
Chabrignac
La Chapelle-aux-Brocs
Chartrier-Ferrière
Chasteaux
Cosnac
Cublac
Dampniat
Donzenac
Estivals
Estivaux
Jugeals-Nazareth
Juillac
Larche
Lascaux
Lissac-sur-Couze
Louignac
Malemort
Mansac
Nespouls
Noailles
Objat
Perpezac-le-Blanc
Rosiers-de-Juillac
Sadroc
Saint-Aulaire
Saint-Bonnet-la-Rivière
Saint-Bonnet-l'Enfantier
Saint-Cernin-de-Larche
Saint-Cyprien
Saint-Cyr-la-Roche
Sainte-Féréole
Saint-Pantaléon-de-Larche
Saint-Pardoux-l'Ortigier
Saint-Robert
Saint-Solve
Saint-Viance
Segonzac
Turenne
Ussac
Varetz
Vars-sur-Roseix
Vignols
Voutezac
Yssandon

References

Brive
Brive